This is a list of species in the agaric genus Phaeocollybia.

Key

Species

References

Phaeocollybia